Shadab Iftikhar is a Pakistani-English football manager. He currently holds an UEFA "A" license.

Career
In addition to league coaching experience, Iftikhar has worked with numerous academies in England including: Billy Stewart International Academy, Stuart Gelling International Academy, Preston North End Community, Pro Vision Academy, and Real Mahad Academy of which he served as director. He has also served as a scout for Roberto Martinez at Wigan Athletic and Everton for two years at each club.

In May 2010, Iftikhar was named the reserve team manager for Hesketh Bank after previously working with the junior teams since 2007 at age 17 while working on his early coaching badges. In 2015, he was named manager of the senior squad the day before the season began. Despite working with a completely new squad and a difficult start to the season, the team finished out of the relegation zone. He also continued to strengthen the reserve squad and saw it promoted to the top reserve league that season. He declined an offer to continue being the squad's manager and left the club following the season. While at Hesketh, he was mentored by Dave Sutton, former professional player and manager of Rochdale.

In June 2012, Iftikar was appointed a first team coach of Nelson of the North West Counties Football League prior to the 2012–13 season. In October 2012 he temporarily took charge of the senior team after co-managers Robert Grimes and Michael Morrison resigned in October 2012.

He was named manager of the university men's team for the University of Central Lancashire which competes in the BUSA Football League for the 2015 season.

In May 2016, he was appointed manager of Bayangol of the Mongolia Premier League The previous season, Bayangol were playing in the Mongolia 1st League but were forced into promotion by the Mongolian Football Federation ten days before the season began after second division club, Continental, declined promotion after earning it for financial reasons. Bayangol were unable to meet Premier League requirements for the team's manager to hold at least an UEFA "B" license or equivalent so they posted the opening on Twitter. Prior to his move to Mongolia, Iftikhar was preparing to travel to Canada for a coaching position he had accepted.

He began serving as an assistant coach for the Mongolian national team during the 2017 EAFF East Asian Cup.

In June 2017, Iftikhar was announced as a new academy coach for Accrington Stanley, then of League Two, securing his return to Britain. In October 2018, Iftikhar signed a deal to take over as new head coach of Vailima Kiwi of the Samoa National League.

By 2021, Iftikhar was part of the staff of Skelmersdale United of the North West Counties League Premier Division.  That year he was reunited with Roberto Martinez as Iftikhar served as a scout for the Belgium national team during UEFA Euro 2020.

At the end of November 2021, Iftikhar was appointed manager of Fort William in the Scottish Highland Football League.

References

1989 births
Living people
English football managers
English people of Pakistani descent
Sportspeople from Preston, Lancashire
Expatriate football managers in Mongolia
Mongolia national football team managers
English expatriate football managers
Preston North End F.C. non-playing staff
Everton F.C. non-playing staff
Wigan Athletic F.C. non-playing staff
Accrington Stanley F.C. non-playing staff
Association football scouts
Association football coaches
Expatriate football managers in Samoa
English expatriate sportspeople in Samoa
Fort William F.C. managers
Highland Football League managers